Dandenong is a southeastern suburb of Melbourne, Victoria, Australia, about  from the Melbourne CBD.

A regional transport hub and manufacturing center of Victoria, Dandenong is located at the junctional region of the Dandenong Valley Highway, Princes Highway, Monash Freeway and Dingley Freeway, and is the gateway town of the Gippsland railway line into West Gippsland. It is directly neighbored from the north and south by two sister suburbs Dandenong North and Dandenong South, from the east by Doveton, and from the northwest and southwest by Noble Park and Keysborough, respectively.  The easternmost and westernmost neighborhoods of suburb are also unofficially named Dandenong East and Dandenong West, separated from the main portions of the suburb by Stud Road and Princes Highway, and Cheltenham Road and Gladstone Road/Jones Road/Bennet Street, respectively.

Dandenong began as a township in 1852 and at the start of the 20th century was an important regional city with its own suburbs. During the mid-20th century it became a major manufacturing and commercial area, and eventually an incorporated satellite city of the expanding Greater Melbourne conurbation. A business district, the former town centre, covers much of its area and is one of the largest in Greater Melbourne. It is currently undergoing major transit-oriented urban renewal, which was first planned in the Melbourne 2030 strategy.

History

Early history
Prior to the European settlement of Australia, the flat to undulating land was densely forested with red gum and was inhabited by the Woiwurrung Indigenous Australian tribe.

The name is generally thought to be derived from the Woiwurrung word "Tanjenong" meaning "lofty mountains" possibly referring to the nearby Dandenong ranges.

Another popular theory is that the name comes from 'bad flour', or 'no good damper'. A local tale revolves around local aboriginals obtaining a bag of lime and mistakenly using it to make damper. An old local hotel was the 'No Good Damper Inn'.

A third version has the name Dandenong coming from 'a burning' and 'the past' reflecting bushfires on the Dandenongs.

European settlement
Joseph Hawdon established a pastoral run on Narra Narrawong in 1837, bringing cattle from Sydney by land. Soon a few timber cutters and a police camp were also located there. Dandenong Post Office opened on 1 July 1848.

By 1850, the whole area had been taken up for grazing. Dandenong Creek was first bridged in 1840. A road was made from Melbourne, making Dandenong, by the late 1850s, an important staging post for travellers into Gippsland. It became known as the 'gateway to Gippsland'. A township was surveyed in 1852. Milling of the red gum timber became an important industry, and charcoal burning, tanning, quarrying and brick making also flourished. A livestock market was established in 1866.

The Western Port Aboriginal Protectorate Station was located north-east of Dandenong from 1840 to 1844. This area had been an important meeting and ceremonial site for Aboriginal tribes. The Native Police Corps established its headquarters there until its disbandment in 1852. The Police Paddocks were then used for breeding and resting police horses.

By 1861, there were 40 houses in the township housing 193 people. In 1866, Dandenong Market commenced trading, selling livestock, fruit, dairy products and other farm produce. Dandenong Shire was proclaimed in 1873. The Australian Handbook records the progress of the town by 1875.

The railway line from Melbourne to Dandenong was constructed in the mid-1870s. Dandenong station opened 8 October 1877.

The Dandenong Town Hall, Lonsdale Street, was built in Free Classical style in 1890 as the combined Shire Hall, Courthouse and Mechanics Institute, at a cost of about 12,000 pounds. The architects were Beswicke and Hutchins and the contractor McCullogh and McAlpine. The two-storey, stucco rendered brick building, on a bluestone base course, features a lofty, Mansard-roofed, corner clock tower and projecting end wings with serlian motif windows and capped by pedimented niches.

Postwar era
The post-war industrial boom brought an influx of European migrants, particularly from Italy and Greece. This caused the creation of several suburbs of Dandenong including the public housing estate of Doveton.

In the 1950s, Melbourne rapidly expanded south east along the Princes Highway and Dandenong railway line to Dandenong and beyond and it became major metropolitan manufacturing and commercial area as industry extended into the outer suburbs. By the late 1960s, it was officially a suburban area of Melbourne and central Dandenong was transformed by modern buildings, with the redevelopment of the post office to a two-storey modern building in 1960 followed by a three-storey office development for AMP in 1966 and Dandenong Railway Station in 1975.

From the early 1960s onward, Albanian immigrants settled in Dandenong and built its first mosque in 1985.

Urban renewal

Development in Dandenong had stagnated since the opening of the Armada Dandenong Plaza shopping centre which resulted in the closure of many shops in the central business district. Under the Melbourne 2030 policy, Dandenong was classified as a major activity centre due to its central location with regard to its access to transport. These projects can be considered to be transit-oriented development, where population density is intended to be higher compared to other areas with poorer access to transport.

In 2006, the Victorian Government committed $290 million towards the Revitalising Central Dandenong initiative, to transform central Dandenong into a vibrant and thriving economic and service hub. The State Government funding was spent on land acquisition and consolidation, delivery of infrastructure upgrades (Londsdale Street, Stockman's Bridge, Station precinct upgrades and public amenity) and facilitation of key catalyst projects such as the Australian Taxation Office, brand new Council Civic Centre and the State Government Services Hub.

Dandenong's redevelopment is undertaken by Development Victoria, a Victorian Government agency responsible for urban renewal, in collaboration with the Greater Dandenong City Council. The project is a long-term project, expected to continue for 15 to 20 years.

Metro 3175, named after Dandenong's postcode is a major redevelopment of the former Dandenong Livestock Market (established 1866 and closed in 1998) begun in November 2005 consisting of a mixed-use development consisting of 1100 residences as well as cafes and restaurants. Because the site is isolated from the rest of the central Dandenong area, George Street was widened and extended with a bridge across the railway lines to improve access between the precincts. The bridge provides access for cars, pedestrians and cyclists and improves connections to bus services in the area. Additionally, Cheltenham Road, a major east–west arterial has been realigned to remove traffic from nearby streets and encourage pedestrian use.

Redevelopment of the Dandenong Town Hall (built 1880) into a performing arts centre began in 2004 known as Drum Theatre to a designed by Williams Ross Architects. The centre was redeveloped with a 525-seat proscenium theatre. At the cost of $13 million, the centre was opened by Victorian Premier Steve Bracks on 11 February 2006. The redevelopment involved renovating the existing town hall building and the construction of a modern drum-shaped building. Its striking red colour is prominently visible from nearby streets in the CBD. There was some controversy over fears the redevelopment would destroy the historic facade of the town hall building, but this proved unfounded.

Geography

Dandenong is bounded in the north by Heatherton Road (State Route 14), in the east by the Dandenong Creek and Claredon Road, in the south by the Dandenong Bypass (State Route 49) and the Pakenham railway line, and in the west by the Yarraman/Mile Creek just east of EastLink (M3).

The suburb is situated northeast of the confluence of the Mile Creek into the lower section of the Dandenong Creek, a major urban stream that flows west from the foothill of the Dandenong Ranges at Olinda before turning at the junction of Ringwood, Vermont and Wantirna to course southwards meandrously and form the Patterson River at Bangholme.  The creek marks most of Dandenong's eastern boundary with the neighboring Doveton, and crosses westwards through the southern edge of the town center, forming a green belt with several riverside linear parks and nature reserves including the Dandenong Park.

Politics

Federal
At federal level, Dandenong is divided between the electoral divisions of Bruce in the north, currently held by Julian Hill since 2016; and Isaacs in the south, held by Mark Dreyfus since 2007, both incumbent Labor representatives.

State
Dandenong belongs to its own electoral district of Dandenong, held currently by Labor representative Gabrielle Williams since 2014.

Demographics

In the 2016 census, there were 29,906 people in Dandenong. The most common ancestries were Afghan 9.4%, Indian 9.3%, English 8.3%, Australian 7.4% and Albanian 4.7%. 28.0% of people were born in Australia. The next most common countries of birth were India 9.5%, Afghanistan 8.7%, Sri Lanka 6.2%, Pakistan 3.5% and China 2.8%. 23.0% of people spoke only English at home. Other languages spoken at home included Hazaraghi 7.9%, Dari 6.4%, Albanian 5.1%, Tamil 4.6% and Punjabi 4.0%. The most common responses for religion were Catholic 34.8%, other Christians 21.2%, Islam 13.7% and no religion 11.6%.

In the 2021 census, Dandenong's population is 14.3 percent Muslim.

Transport

Dandenong is primarily a private transport-dependent community due to the relatively poorer public transit compared to other suburbs closer to the CBD.  It is served by the Monash Freeway (M1) which passes near its northeast, as well as several other major arterial roads such as the Princes Highway (National Route 1), Stud Road/Dandenong-Frankston Road (State Route 9), Cheltenham Road (Route 10), Heatherton Road (Route 14) and Dandenong Bypass (Route 49).  The EastLink (M3) also passes near the western edge of the suburb, and the South Gippsland Highway (Route 12) branches off the Princes Highway at the southeastern corner of the suburb.

The Dandenong railway station is situated at the southern edge of the suburb CBD and is an interchange station for the Pakenham and Cranbourne lines, as well as V/Line regional trains on the Gippsland railway line.  It is approximately 50 minutes from Flinders Street station in Melbourne CBD by stopping-all-station train, but shorter if via limited express services.  The Victorian state government has proposed triplication of the railway line to support a higher volume of trains for the growing population in and around Dandenong as well as other suburbs and towns along the line.

The station also serves as a transport hub for the local bus network, with almost all bus routes in the area passing through Dandenong station and an interchange on Langhorne Street in the CBD. Most buses in the area are operated by Ventura Bus Lines, whose depot is located near the railway station.

Cycling is facilitated via the Dandenong Creek Trail, part of the off-road cycling network which connects the city trails to nearby Jells Park.

In a council planning policy document, light rail is suggested as a future transport mode for the central Dandenong area.

Education

Three state high schools – Lyndale Secondary College and two campuses of Dandenong High School (Dandenong and Cleeland) – and one Catholic high school (St John's Regional College), as well as numerous state and two Catholic primary schools, are located within the suburb's boundaries. Dandenong also contains Emerson School, a specialist school for those with mild intellectual disabilities from a catchment area

Sport

The suburb has a couple of Australian Rules football teams, one is the Dandenong Redlegs (formerly Dandenong Demons/Dandenong West), competing in the Southern Football League at the Dandenong Showgrounds. Other teams in the Dandenong Area include the Dandenong Stingrays (Under 18 TAC Cup – Elite Junior) at Shepley Oval, St John's Old Collegians (VAFA and VWFL – Senior) at Carroll Reserve, and the Dandenong Saints (DDJFL – Junior) at Carroll Reserve. Numerous clubs have folded in recent years

Dandenong hosts numerous football (soccer) clubs. Dandenong Thunder plays in the Victorian Premier League which is the second tier behind the A-League and enjoys much support from the local community. The side plays their home fixtures at George Andrews Reserve has been both premiers and champions of Victoria multiple times. The other teams are Dandenong City SC, White Star Dandenong FC and Dandenong Wolves Football Club. Dandenong based teams have hosted many international players in its time. These include players such as Ljubo Miličević, Eugene Galeković, Ante Milicic, Cengiz Benlisoy, Semih Yildiz, Cenk Ali and Ilker Berberoglu.

Dandenong also has numerous cricket clubs in the area. Dandenong Cricket Club plays in the Victorian Premier League and has produced a number of state players to date. The most important of these have been Peter Siddle (Australia), Darren Pattinson (England) and Cameron White (Australia) who have all gone on to play test cricket. Other prominent players from the club include Ian Harvey, James Pattinson, Brett Forsyth, Ercan Ileri, Jackson Coleman and Kumar Sana. The area also consists of a women's team, the Dandenong Women's Cricket Club who compete in the Victorian Women's Cricket Association.
Several other clubs in the area play in the Dandenong and District Cricket Association (DDCA). These include Buckley Ridges, Dandenong North, Dandenong West, and the St Mary's Cricket Clubs. Other clubs within the City of Greater Dandenong include Coomoora, Keysborough, Lyndale, Parkfield, Silverton, Southern Pirates, Springvale and Springvale South Cricket Clubs.
Noble Park Cricket Club is also located within the City of Greater Dandenong, and plays in the Victorian Sub-District Cricket Association.

The South Eastern Titans Rugby League club fields both junior & senior teams in the NRL Victoria competition. Their home ground is located at Greaves Reserve.

Golfers play at the course of the Forest Hills Golf Club on Wedge Street, Dandenong.

Dandenong Stadium

The Dandenong stadium is the home of the Dandenong Rangers (an Australian Women's Basketball League team) and Victoria's state volleyball competition, and from 7 to 12 July played host to the 2008 Australian Junior Volleyball Championships.

Notable residents
 Bert Cremean (1900–45), politician, held district of Dandenong 1929–32
 Winnie Quagliotti (1931–1988), Wurundjeri community leader
 Vince Grella (1979–), Former soccer player for Socceroos and Blackburn Rovers
 Adam Treloar (1993–), Australian Football League (AFL) player for Western Bulldogs 
 Andrew Bogut (1984–), Former NBA for Golden State Warriors
 Ajdin Hrustic (1996–), Footballer for Eintracht Frankfurt
 Scott McDonald (1983–) Footballer for the Western Sydney Wanderers FC
 Adam Collins (1984–) Sports journalist and broadcaster

Sister cities
 Xuzhou, Jiangsu, China 1996 City of Greater Dandenong – Sister City Relationship

See also
 City of Dandenong – Dandenong was previously within this former local government area.
 Electoral district of Dandenong

References

External links

History of Dandenong
Dandenong Theatre Company
Windmill Theatre Company
Revitalising Central Dandenong
City of Greater Dandenong – Major Developments
Australian Places – Dandenong
What's In A Name?
RLHP Local Stories: Name Origins of Places In Rowville and Lysterfield

 
Suburbs of Melbourne
Suburbs of the City of Greater Dandenong
Populated places established in 1852
1852 establishments in Australia